Johann Sebastian Bach composed the church cantata  (I, wretched man, a servant to sin), 55, in Leipzig for the 22nd Sunday after Trinity and first performed it on 17 November 1726.

History and words 
Bach wrote the cantata, a solo cantata for a tenor, in 1726 in Leipzig for the 22nd Sunday after Trinity. It is Bach's only extant cantata for tenor.

The prescribed readings for the Sunday were from the Epistle to the Philippians, thanks and prayer for the congregation in Philippi, and from the Gospel of Matthew, the parable of the unforgiving servant. Christoph Birkmann, the poet of the cantata text stressed the opposites of the gospel, God's justice versus unjust men, in the words of the first aria "" ("He is just, unjust am I"). In the first two movements the singer reflects his sinful condition, in the following two he asks God for mercy, beginning both with Erbarme dich ("Have mercy"). The following closing chorale is verse 6  of Johann Rist "" (1642). Bach used the same verse later in his St Matthew Passion, again following Erbarme dich, the aria of Peter, regretting his denial of Jesus.

Bach led the first performance on 17 November 1726.

Scoring and structure 
The cantata in five movements is scored for a tenor soloist, a four-part choir (only for the final chorale), flauto traverso, oboe d'amore, two violins, viola, and basso continuo.

 Aria:  ("I, wretched man, a servant to sin")
 Recitative:  ("I have offended against God")
 Aria:  ("Have mercy! Let my tears move Thee")
 Recitative:  ("Have mercy! However, I console myself")
 Chorale:  ("Though I have turned aside from Thee, Yet shall I return")

Music 
A rich polyphonic setting for flute, oboe d'amore and two violins, without viola, accompanies the opening aria. The motifs seem to illustrate the faltering steps and a despairing heart of the steward summoned before his master. The second aria is as expressive, accompanied by a virtuoso flute. The first recitative is secco, but the second one accompanied by string chords.

The closing chorale is verse 6 of Johann Rist's "Werde munter", to Johann Schop's tune. The same text and melody occur in the St Matthew Passion, there in a simpler four-part setting, and Bach uses Schop's melody with other texts such as the well known "Jesu, Joy of Man's Desiring" in Herz und Mund und Tat und Leben, BWV 147.

The last three movements of the autograph score differ from the Leipzig performance parts, leading some to conclude they were originally part of an earlier composition, possibly the lost 1717 Weimar Passion.

Recordings 
 Bach Cantatas Vol. 5, Karl Richter, Münchener Bach-Chor, Münchener Bach-Orchester, Ernst Haefliger, Archiv Produktion 1959
 Bach Made in Germany Vol. 3 – Cantatas II, Erhard Mauersberger, Thomanerchor, Gewandhausorchester Leipzig, Peter Schreier, Eterna 1968
 Bach: Solokantaten, Hans-Martin Linde, Schola Cantorum Basiliensis, Nicolai Gedda, EMI 1971
 J. S. Bach: Das Kantatenwerk – Sacred Cantatas Vol. 3, Gustav Leonhardt, Knabenchor Hannover, Leonhardt-Consort, Kurt Equiluz, Telefunken 1975
 Die Bach Kantate Vol. 57, Helmuth Rilling, Gächinger Kantorei, Bach-Collegium Stuttgart, Adalbert Kraus, Hänssler 1982
 J. S. Bach: Solo-Kantaten und Arien, Peter Schreier, RIAS Kammerchor, Kammerorchester Carl Philipp Emanuel Bach, Peter Schreier, Philips 1994
 J. S. Bach: Kantate BWV 55 · Concerto a-Moll, Matthias Eisenberg, Thomanerchor Leipzig, Leipziger Barockorchester, Martin Petzold, RAM 1998
 Cantatas, Arias & Motet, Ludwig Güttler, Virtuosi Saxoniae, Christoph Genz, Dresden Classics 1999
 Bach Cantatas Vol. 12, John Eliot Gardiner, Monteverdi Choir, English Baroque Soloists, James Gilchrist, Soli Deo Gloria 2000
 J. S. Bach: Complete Cantatas Vol. 18, Ton Koopman, Amsterdam Baroque Orchestra & Choir, Christoph Prégardien, Antoine Marchand 2002
 J. S. Bach: Cantatas for the Complete Liturgical Year Vol. 1, Sigiswald Kuijken, La Petite Bande, Sophie Karthäuser, Petra Noskaiová, Christoph Genz, Dominik Wörner, Accent 2004
 J. S. Bach: Cantatas Vol. 38 (Solo Cantatas), Masaaki Suzuki, Bach Collegium Japan, Gerd Türk, BIS 2006

References

Sources 
 
 Ich armer Mensch, ich Sündenknecht BWV 55; BC A 157 / Sacred cantata (22nd Sunday after Trinity) Bach Digital
 Cantata BWV 55 Ich armer Mensch, ich Sündenknecht history, scoring, sources for text and music, translations to various languages, discography, discussion, Bach Cantatas Website
 BWV 55 – "Ich armer Mensch, ich Sündenknecht" English translation, discussion, Emmanuel Music
 Ich armer Mensch, ich Sündenknecht English translation, University of Vermont
 Ich armer Mensch, ich Sündenknecht text, scoring, University of Alberta
 Chapter 32 BWV 55 Ich armer Mensch, ich Sündenknecht / I, a desolate man, am in bondage to sin. Julian Mincham, 2010

External links 
 Ich armer Mensch, ich Sündenknecht, BWV 55: performance by the Netherlands Bach Society (video and background information)

Church cantatas by Johann Sebastian Bach
1726 compositions